Bridget G. MacCarthy (7 June 1904 – April 1993) was an Irish academic and writer. She has been described as one of the most important female cultural and literary historians.

Biography
Bridget Gerard MacCarthy was born to Jeremiah MacCarthy and Bridget Quinlan of 7 Wellington Square, Cork on 7 June 1904. She was the youngest daughter of four girls and a boy. She was educated in University College Cork and completed her BA in 1925. She followed that with an MA in 1927 and went on to do a PhD in Cambridge in 1940 on Women's contribution to the development of the English novel: 1621-1818. MacCarthy worked as a teacher in Edinburgh, in the Craiglockhart Roman Catholic Training College. She then moved on to become a lecturer in the Department of Education in Cork and finished as a Professor of English in University College Cork. She wrote two volumes of The Female Pen which were published in 1944 and 1947. These were her defining works. She did complete several plays and essays and she was published in Studies: An Irish Quarterly Review and The Dublin Magazine. In her personal life she married but she and her husband only lived together for a short time. She lived with her aunt after her mother died. MacCarthy retired in 1966 and gave her entire library away. She died in April 1993.

Selected works

 The psychology of genius; studies in Browning, 1936
 The whip hand : a comedy in three acts, 1943
 The female pen : women writers and novelists, 1621–1818, 1944 
 Despite fools' laughter; poems, editor, 1944
 Some problems of child welfare, editor, 1945
 The later women novelists, 1744–1818, 1947
 Thackeray in Ireland, 1951
 Women writers : their contribution to the English novel, 1621–1744, 1977

References and sources

1904 births
1993 deaths
People from Cork (city)
20th-century Irish historians
Irish women non-fiction writers
Alumni of University College Cork
20th-century Irish non-fiction writers
20th-century Irish women writers
Women historians
Academics of University College Cork